Spainsat NG is a Spanish communications satellite program aimed at developing next-generation satellites to meet Spain's government and military secure communications needs.

The industrial management of the program is carried out by a consortium of four contractors: Airbus Defense and Space in Spain and France, and Thales Alenia Space in Spain and France. Other companies from the Spanish space sector that will also participate are Acorde, Anteral, Arquimea, Crisa, GMV, Iberespacio, Indra, Sener and Tecnobit. Public participation includes the Ministry of Defence, the Ministry of Industry, CDTI, INTA and ESA. The satellites operator will be Hisdesat.

The Spainsat NG program comprises two satellites, Spainsat NG I and Spainsat NG II, which will be located in geostationary orbit and will operate in X-band, military Ka-band and UHF. These satellites will be based on the Eurostar Neo platform, Airbus' new geostationary telecommunications satellite product. This platform is a significant evolution of the reliable Eurostar platform. The communication payloads of both satellites will be provided by the Spanish industry, with Airbus in Spain being responsible for the X-band payload and Thales in Spain being responsible for the Ka and UHF band payloads.

The satellites will have protection against interference, as well as the ability to precisely geolocate the origin of the interference, and will probably also have protection against high altitude nuclear explosions (HANE).

The first satellite, Spainsat NG I, will be launched in 2024 and will occupy the GEO 29º E position, replacing XTAR-EUR. The second one, the Spainsat NG II, will be launched in 2025 and will occupy the GEO 30º W position, replacing Spainsat. The Spainsat NG satellites will have an operational useful life of 15 years, remaining in service until 2040. Both launches will be performed by a SpaceX Falcon 9 rocket.

In October 2020, Spainsat NG program successfully passed the Preliminary Design Review (PDR) and in December 2021 it passed the Critical Design Review (CDR).

See also 

 Spainsat

References

External links 
 Hisdesat's website 

Satellites of Spain
Communications satellites